Dawangzhuang Station, is a station of Line 9 of the Tianjin Metro. It was opened in late 2012.

References

External links 

Railway stations in Tianjin
Railway stations in China opened in 2012
Tianjin Metro stations